San Gabriel Peak is a summit in the San Gabriel Mountains in the U.S. state of California. It was named by the United States Geological Survey in 1894 and is located in the Angeles National Forest. This peak was first named The Commodore for Commodore Perry Switzer.

Background
The name is derived from the Misión del Santo Arcangel San Gabriel de los Temblores. From this mission had already come the names of the San Gabriel River and San Gabriel Canyon, the mountain range itself and the entire San Gabriel Valley.

The steep south face drops approximately 1,000 feet into the center of an amphitheater at the top of Eaton Canyon, forming one of the most sustained steep slopes in the Western San Gabriel mountain range.

References

Mountains of Los Angeles County, California
San Gabriel Mountains
Mountains of Southern California